WLRC is a radio station airing a brokered religious format licensed to Walnut, Mississippi, broadcasting on 850 kHz AM.  The station is owned by B. R. and Martha S. Clayton.

References

External links

LRC
LRC
Tippah County, Mississippi
Brokered programming